WPAT may refer to:

 WPAT (AM), a radio station (930 AM) licensed to Paterson, New Jersey, United States
 WPAT-FM, a radio station (93.1 FM) licensed to Paterson, New Jersey, United States
 the ICAO airport code for Atauro Airport on Atauro Island, Dili, East Timor